The Secretary General is the person in charge of the General Secretariat of the Government of Serbia. The current Secretary General is Novak Nedić, in office since 1 May 2014.

List of secretaries general
Political Party:

References

External links
 Serbian Government – Secretariat-General
 Serbian ministries, etc – Rulers.org

Government of Serbia
Politics of Serbia